"This Girl" is a song by Australian funk trio Cookin' on 3 Burners, featuring vocals by Kylie Auldist, released on 22 June 2009 as the second single from the group's second album, Soul Messin. A remix by French DJ and record producer Kungs was released as a digital download on 19 February 2016 by House of Barclay as the lead single from his debut studio album, Layers (2016), which found major success across Europe.

Kungs remix

The Kungs remix of "This Girl" reached number one in a number of countries including France and Germany and the top 10 in 18 countries including Austria, Canada, Denmark, Ireland, Italy, Netherlands, Spain, Sweden, Switzerland, and the United Kingdom.

The song was performed on stage by Kungs with the vocalist Mel Sugar on the French television show Le Petit Journal on 24 March 2016. An EP featuring an extended mix of the track, two remixes and a solo track by Kungs titled "Milos" was released on iTunes on 26 March 2016. Billboard ranked "This Girl" at number 48 on their "100 Best Pop Songs of 2016" list.

Music video
The accompanying music video for the remix was filmed on the Greek island of Milos. It was released on Kungs' Vevo channel on YouTube on 24 March 2016. It was directed by Matt Larson for La Main Productions. The models in the video are Louis Rault and Irina Martynenko. The video starts with the boy and girl meeting on a cruise ship. They later become a couple and starting dancing in their bedroom. The ship reaches the shore, and the boy and girl explore the land, coming across lakes and hills. They later discover a cave and begin dancing in the cave over a bonfire. As of 10 September 2022, the video had reached over 476 million views on YouTube.

Track listing
All tracks except "Milos" credited to Kungs and Cookin' on 3 Burners.

Charts

Weekly charts

Year-end charts

Certifications

Release history

Legacy
In 2010, the original version of the song was featured in the fourteenth episode of the tenth season of Degrassi, well before the Kungs version rose to fame.

This song has been featured in Apple ads in general and the Shot on iPhone challenge which a meme is based on.

In 2016, British online department store Littlewoods included the song in a TV advertising campaign. The song was featured in a 2017 commercial for Cricket Wireless in association with Samsung, and later used as the theme music for the U.S. version of Big Star's Little Star. The song has also been adopted by football fans and chants have been inspired by the song's rhythm, such as Liverpool's Georginio Wijnaldum, Arsenal's Alexandre Lacazette, former Manchester City F.C.'s Fernandinho, Reading's Andy Yiadom, Inverness Caledonian Thistle's Coll Donaldson, Oxford United's Cameron Brannagan and King's Lynn Town's Adam Marriott. FC Porto goals in Estádio do Dragão are celebrated with the song's chorus in the background. It is also the goal celebration song for Leicester City 

In 2021, this song was chosen by fans of the Philadelphia Flyers as their new goal song.

References

2009 songs
2009 singles
2016 singles
Kungs songs
Universal Music Group singles
Casablanca Records singles
SNEP Top Singles number-one singles
Number-one singles in Germany
Number-one singles in Hungary
Number-one singles in Scotland
Ultratop 50 Singles (Wallonia) number-one singles
House music songs
Tropical house songs